The 2010 European Weightlifting Championships was held in Minsk, Belarus from 2 April to 11 April 2010. It was the 89th edition of the event, which was first staged in 1896.

Medal overview

Men

Women

Doping cases

 Mikalai Cherniak from Belarus who won silver medal in snatch and bronze medal in total at the men's 77 kg category, tested positive after the competition.
 Rovshan Fatullayev from Azerbaijan who won 2 silver medals in the men's 94 kg (c&j and total) and a bronze medal in snatch, tested positive after the competition.
 Andrei Aramnau from Belarus who won 3 gold medal in all discipline at the men's 105 kg category, tested positive after the competition.
 Boyan Poleyanov from Bulgaria who originally finished 8th in snatch, 7th in c&j and 7th in total at the men's +105 kg category, tested positive after the competition.

Women
 Marina Ohman from Israel who originally finished 7th in snatch, 10th in c&j and 10th in total at the women's 63 kg category, tested positive after the competition.
 Shemshat Tuliayeva from Belarus who won 2 bronze medals at the women's 69 kg (snatch and total), tested positive after the competition.
 Hripsime Khurshudyan from Armenia who won 3 bronze medals in all discipline at the women's 75 kg category, tested positive after the competition.
Olha Korobka from Ukraine who won 3 silver medals in all discipline at the women's +75 kg category, tested positive after the competition.

Medals tables 

Ranking by all medals: "Big" (Total result) and "Small" (Snatch and Clean&Jerk)

Ranking by "Big" (Total result) medals

References

External links 
 
IWF results

E
European Weightlifting Championships
European Weightlifting Championships
European Weightlifting Championships
2010 European Weightlifting Championships
Weightlifting in Belarus